Yudham is a 1983 Indian Malayalam language film, directed by J. Sasikumar and produced by K. P. Kottarakkara. The film stars Prem Nazir, Madhu, Ratheesh and Poornima Jayaram. The film has musical score by Shankar–Ganesh.

Cast
Prem Nazir as Bappootty
Madhu as Ramu 
Ratheesh as Prabhakara Menon, Rajesh (double role)
Poornima Jayaram as Sheela
Srividya as Aysha
Janaki as Young Sheela
Sudhakar as Young Salim
K. R. Savithri as Malathy 
Balan K Nair as Velu / K.V.K
Sankaradi as Esthappan
Sukumari as Bhageerathi
Ramu as Vinod
KP Kumar as Babu
Devi as Usha
Thodupuzha Radhakrishnan as Madhusudhanan
Kunchan as Flirt
Sabitha Anand as Radha
Radhadevi as Annamma teacher 
Chandra as Diana
 Anuradha
 Janaki

Soundtrack
The music was composed by Shankar–Ganesh and the lyrics were written by Poovachal Khader.

References

External links
 

1983 films
1980s Malayalam-language films
Films scored by Shankar–Ganesh